Charles Louis Bivins (October 16, 1938 – March 15, 1994) was an American football running back who played for the National Football League's Chicago Bears and Pittsburgh Steelers and the American Football League's Buffalo Bills.  Bivins played college football at Morris Brown College.

1938 births
Living people
Players of American football from Atlanta
American football running backs
Morris Brown Wolverines football players
Chicago Bears players
Pittsburgh Steelers players
Buffalo Bills players
American Football League players